Mate Tsintsadze  (born 7 January 1995) is  Georgian footballer who plays as a midfielder for Albanian club Kukësi and Georgian national team.

Honours
 Dinamo Tbilisi
Georgian League (2): 2013–14, 2015–16
Georgian Cup (3): 2013–14, 2014–15, 2015–16
Georgian Super Cup (2): 2014/2015, 2015/2016

Torpedo Kutaisi
Georgian Cup (2): 2018, 2022

References

External links

UEFA Profile
FC Dinamo Tbilisi official Profile

1995 births
Living people
Footballers from Georgia (country)
Georgia (country) international footballers
Association football midfielders
FC Lokomotivi Tbilisi players
FC Torpedo Kutaisi players
FC Dinamo Tbilisi players
Pogoń Szczecin players
FC Metalurgi Rustavi players
FK Jelgava players
FC Dinamo Batumi players
Erovnuli Liga players
Ekstraklasa players
Latvian Higher League players
Expatriate footballers in Poland
Expatriate footballers in Latvia
Expatriate sportspeople from Georgia (country) in Poland